The Hundred Flowers Award for Best Art Direction was first awarded by the China Film Association in 1962.

1980s

1960s

References

Art Direction
Awards for best art direction